Oswald Graham Noel Turnbull  (20 December 1890 – 17 December 1970) was an English tennis player. He is best known for his gold medal in the men's doubles event (with Maxwell Woosnam) at the 1920 Antwerp Olympics.

Before World War I Turnbull worked at the family firm of ship-owners. During the war he served as a driver, and during the Battle of the Somme won the Military Cross. In 1919 he had his first major tennis tournament, the Davis Cup. In 1921 he played again in the Cup and won the singles at the Portuguese Championships, but then disappeared from tennis for four years to focus on golf. In 1926 he returned to the Davis Cup, and in 1928 again won the singles at the Portuguese Championships.

References

1890 births
1970 deaths
English Olympic medallists
Olympic gold medallists for Great Britain
Olympic tennis players of Great Britain
Tennis players at the 1920 Summer Olympics
Olympic medalists in tennis
Medalists at the 1920 Summer Olympics
Recipients of the Military Cross
English male tennis players
British male tennis players
Tennis people from Greater London
British Army personnel of World War I
Royal Army Service Corps officers